Nawab Sadiq Hussain Qureshi (25 July 1927 – 24 June 2000) was a Pakistani politician who served as both Governor and Chief Minister of Punjab under Zulfikar Ali Bhutto in the 1970s. A close aid of Mr. Bhutto during his time in power, he retired from all active politics after the military coup of 1977 that ousted Bhutto's government.

He was born in the Indian hill station town of Shimla, although his family is native to Multan. Educated at Aitchison College, Lahore, he was forced into responsibility at a young age after his father was killed during the partition. At the time Sadiq Hussain Qureshi was only 20 years old.

He turned his attention to politics in the late 1960s and early 1970s. Starting on the district council level as a vice chairman, he rose through the political ranks, being elected as a Member of Provincial Assembly (MPA), a Member of the National Assembly (MNA) and then being appointed advisor to the Governor. He assumed the post of Agriculture Minister Punjab in 1971. A member of the Pakistan Peoples Party he was chosen by Prime Minister Bhutto as Governor of the Punjab, a post he held from November 1973 to March 1975. He was then elevated to the position of Chief Minister Punjab, where he served until the imposition of Martial law in July 1977.

As well as his political posts, Sadiq Hussain Qureshi also held office as the president of the Pakistan Hockey Federation from 1971– 1976. During his time Pakistan won the first field hockey world cup in Spain (1971), finished runners up to India in the same tournament in Malaysia (1975), claimed a silver medal at the Munich Olympic Games (1972) and a bronze at Montreal (1976).

After the ouster of the Bhutto government in 1977, Sadiq Hussain Qureshi retired from active politics. He owned the Pepsi Cola factory in Lahore until the mid-1980s and after selling that concentrated on his land holdings in Multan. Despite offers during his later years he never held an elected office or participated in active politics again.

He had three sons and a daughter. He died at Lahore in June 2000.

He was a widely respected figure even after his death, especially in his native Multan and the province of Punjab, both of whom he served with great distinction throughout his life.

External links 
Pakistan Hockey Federation

Chief Ministers of Punjab, Pakistan
Governors of Punjab, Pakistan
Aitchison College alumni
People from Shimla
Pakistan Hockey Federation presidents
1927 births
2000 deaths
Punjabi people
Politicians from Multan
Sadiq Hussain
Punjab MPAs 1972–1977